Christoph Cloëtta, (24 September 1836 - 30 March 1897) was a Swiss-born Danish chocolatier and founder of the Brødrene Cloëtta chocolate factory in Copenhagen. Cloëtta was appointed as Swiss consul in 1888.

Early life and education
Cloëtta was born on 24 September 1836 at Bergün in Graubünden, Switzerland, the son of local farmer Nuttin Cloëtta (1803–83) and Jacobea Janett (1810–99). Christoph and his brothers Bernhard and Nuttin moved to Copenhagen. They started out by operating various smaller Swiss-style conditoreis.

Career
 
On 3 November 1862, Christoph Cloëtta and his two brothers opened a chocolate factory under the name Brødrene Cloëtta (Cloëtta Brothers) in which he soon came to play a dominant role. The factory was initially based in a building at Sortedam Mill outside the city but was after a few years moved to a building at Niels Hemmingsens Gade 32. This led to a period with rapid growth. Brødrene Cloëtta was in 1983 granted a royal warrant.

In 1873 they also opened a chocolate factory in Malmö. It was headed by  Nuttin Cloëtta. It was followed by a chocolate factory in Kristiania (now Oslo) in 1896.

Personal life and legacy
 
Cloëtta  married Ida Friis (16 March 1848 - 21 February 1901), a daughter of war secretary Nis Fritz Friis (1809–84) and Axeline Louise Adelaide Tuxen (1816–98), on 14 May 1869 in Købelev.

Cloëtta was appointed as Swiss consul in 1888. He is one of the businessmen depicted on Peder Severin Krøyer's monumental 1895 group portrait painting From Copenhagen Stock Exchange in Børsen. He died on 30 May 1897 and is buried at Assistens Cemetery. His gravestone features a bronze portrait relief.

The company was continued by his widow and his son Fritz Bernhard Cloëtta (12 February 1876 - 15 May 1950). Fritz Bernhard Cloëtta was from 1901 the sole owner of the company. The operations were that same year moved to a new building at Hørsholmsgade 20 in Nørrebro. The company moved to Glostrup in the first half of the 1950s and is now headquartered in Ljungsbro, Sweden.

See also
 Grandjean House
 Christian F. Kehlet

References

External links

19th-century Danish businesspeople
Danish chocolatiers
Swiss chocolatiers
Swiss emigrants to Denmark
1836 births
1897 deaths